Qaleh-ye Bozeh Rud (also Romanized as Qal‘eh-ye Bozeh Rūd; also known as Boz Rūd, Buzrūd, Kulāh, Qal‘eh Barzūd, and Qal‘eh Bezarūd) is a village in Kanduleh Rural District, Dinavar District, Sahneh County, Kermanshah Province, Iran. At the 2006 census, its population was 221, in 75 families.

References 

Populated places in Sahneh County